The Old Cathedral of the Holy Name of Jesus  also called Holy Name of Jesus Cathedral is the former headquarters of the diocese of Bragança-Miranda in northeastern Portugal. The temple was built in the sixteenth century have the functions of a convent. In 1764, with the transfer of the seat of the diocese of Braganza Miranda do Douro, the building became the diocesan cathedral. With the opening of the new cathedral in 2001, the church became a parish church.

The temple is dedicated to the Holy Name of Jesus and John the Baptist. The building is classified as a "monument of public interest" by the Directorate General of Cultural Heritage of Portugal.

See also
 Roman Catholicism in Portugal
 Holy Name of Jesus Cathedral, Fianarantsoa
 List of Jesuit sites

References

Braganca
Roman Catholic churches in Bragança, Portugal
Roman Catholic churches completed in 1562
Monuments of Public Interest in Portugal
16th-century Roman Catholic church buildings in Portugal